San Nicolás is a Romanesque-style church in the diocese of Villoria in the concejo de Laviana, community of Asturias, Spain.

See also
Asturian art
Catholic Church in Spain

References

Churches in Asturias
12th-century Roman Catholic church buildings in Spain
Romanesque architecture in Asturias
Bien de Interés Cultural landmarks in Asturias